Australosymmerus is a genus of fungus gnats in the family Ditomyiidae.

Species
A. aculeatus (Edwards, 1921)
A. acutus Munroe, 1974
A. anthostylus Colless, 1970
A. basalis (Tonnoir, 1927)
A. bifasciatus (Williston, 1900)
A. bisetosus (Edwards, 1940)
A. bivittatus (Freeman, 1951)
A. bororo (Lane, 1947)
A. collessi Munroe, 1974
A. confusus Munroe, 1974
A. cornutus Colless, 1970
A. fumipennis (Tonnoir, 1927)
A. fuscinervis (Edwards, 1921)
A. guarani (Lane, 1947)
A. guayanasi (Lane, 1947)
A. imperfectus (Riek, 1954)
A. incerta (Bigot, 1888)
A. insolitus (Walker, 1836)
A. lenkoi Lane, 1959
A. lobatus Munroe, 1974
A. maculatus Munroe, 1974
A. magellani Munroe, 1974
A. magnificus Munroe, 1974
A. minutus Munroe, 1974
A. montorum Munroe, 1974
A. naevius Colless, 1970
A. nebulosus Colless, 1970
A. nitidus (Tonnoir, 1927)
A. pedifer (Edwards, 1940)
A. peruensis Munroe, 1974
A. propinquus Colless, 1970
A. rieki (Colless, 1970)
A. simplex (Freeman, 1951)
A. stigmaticus (Philippi, 1865)
A. tillyardi (Tonnoir, 1927)
A. tonnoiri Colless, 1970
A. trivittatus (Edwards, 1927)
A. truncatus Munroe, 1974
A. tupi (Lane, 1947)

References

Ditomyiidae
Sciaroidea genera